Shanagolden may refer to:

Places
Ireland
 Shanagolden, County Limerick
United States
 Shanagolden, Wisconsin, town 
 Shanagolden (community), Wisconsin, unincorporated community